The Einstøding Islands are a group of three small islands,  north of the Stanton Group off the coast of Mac. Robertson Land. They were mapped by Norwegian cartographers from air photos taken by the Lars Christensen Expedition, 1936–37, and named "Einstødingane".

See also 
 List of Antarctic and sub-Antarctic islands

References 

Islands of Mac. Robertson Land